Jonathan Halapio (born June 23, 1991) is an American football center who is a free agent. He was drafted by the New England Patriots in the sixth round of the 2014 NFL Draft. He played college football at Florida.

College career
Halapio attended the University of Florida from 2009 to 2013. During his career, he started 43 of 51 games at guard and was a team captain his junior and senior seasons.

Professional career

New England Patriots 
Halapio was drafted by the New England Patriots in the sixth round of the 2014 NFL Draft. He was released on August 30, 2014, as part of final roster cuts.

Denver Broncos 
On December 17, 2014, Halapio was signed to the Denver Broncos practice squad. On May 11, 2015, Halapio was waived.

Arizona Cardinals 
On June 5, 2015, Halapio signed with the Arizona Cardinals. On September 5, 2015, he was released by the team.

New England Patriots (second stint) 
On July 27, 2016, Halapio was signed by the Patriots.
On September 3, 2016, he was released by the Patriots as part of final roster cuts.

New York Giants
On September 29, 2016, Halapio was signed to the Giants' practice squad. He signed a reserve/future contract with the Giants on January 9, 2017. He was waived on September 2, 2017 and was signed to the Giants' practice squad the next day. He was promoted to the active roster on October 4, 2017. He made his first career start in Week 12 at right guard in place of the injured D. J. Fluker.

On March 12, 2018, Halapio re-signed with the Giants. He was named the Giants starting center to start the season, beating out Brett Jones. On September 16, 2018, he suffered a broken right ankle and lower leg in a Week 2 game against the Dallas Cowboys and was ruled out for the rest of the season. He was placed on injured reserve on September 19, 2018.

On March 8, 2019, Halapio re-signed with the Giants. He started 15 games for the Giants in 2019, missing one due to a hamstring injury. Following Week 17, Halapio underwent surgery to repair a torn Achilles.

On September 2, 2020, Halapio re-signed with the Giants, but was released three days later.

Denver Broncos (second stint)
On November 9, 2020, the Broncos signed Halapio to their practice squad. He was released after the regular season on January 7, 2021.

San Francisco 49ers
On October 18, 2021, Halapio was signed to the San Francisco 49ers practice squad.

References

External links
New England Patriots bio
Florida Gators bio

1991 births
Living people
Players of American football from St. Petersburg, Florida
American football offensive guards
American people of Tongan descent
Florida Gators football players
New England Patriots players
Arizona Cardinals players
Boston Brawlers players
Brooklyn Bolts players
New York Giants players
San Francisco 49ers players